A Man Called Ove may refer to:

 A Man Called Ove (novel), a 2012 novel by Fredrik Backman
 A Man Called Ove (film), a 2015 film adaptation of the novel